John Joseph Guzik III (born September 25, 1962) is a former American football defensive lineman who played one season with the New England Patriots of the National Football League. He played college football at Ohio University and attended Midpark High School in Middleburg Heights, Ohio.

References

External links
Just Sports Stats

Living people
1962 births
Players of American football from Cleveland
American football defensive tackles
American football defensive ends
Ohio Bobcats football players
New England Patriots players